The Central Asia-Caucasus Institute or CACI was founded in 1996 by S. Frederick Starr, a research professor at Johns Hopkins University's School of Advanced International Studies. He has served as vice president of Tulane University and as president of Oberlin College (1983–1994) and the Aspen Institute. He has advised three U.S. presidents on Russian/Eurasian affairs and chaired an external advisory panel on U.S. government-sponsored research on the region, organized and co-authored the first strategic assessment of Central Asia, the Caucasus and Afghanistan for the Joint Chiefs of Staff in 1999, and was involved in the drafting of recent U.S. legislation affecting the region.

The Central Asia-Caucasus Institute and the Silk Road Studies Program, which is housed within the Institute for Security and Development Policy (ISDP), form a joint think tank with offices in Washington, D.C. and Stockholm, Sweden. Dr. S. Frederick Starr serves as the chairman, while Dr. Svante E. Cornell serves as director of the institute. The institute's fellows include Dr. Stephen Blank and Dr. Brenda Shaffer. CACI was affiliated with the Paul H. Nitze School of Advanced International Studies at Johns Hopkins University for 19 years, until February 2017. The institute is currently based at the American Foreign Policy Council's (AFPC) offices on Capitol Hill. Its in-house publications include the CACI Analyst, the Turkey Analyst, the China and Eurasia Forum Quarterly, and the Silk Road Paper series. The series includes papers and monographs on topics such as the Armenian-Azerbaijani conflict, democracy and the electoral process in Georgia, civic nationhood in Azerbaijan, economic corruption in post-Soviet Central Asia, and the rule of law in Georgia.

CACI also mounts a program of forums in Washington D.C. jointly with the Atlantic Council.

CACI sponsors a Rumsfeld Fellowship program jointly with the Rumsfeld Foundation. The goal of the program is to foster better understanding and build stronger relations between the United States and countries of the region. Since its inaugural session in the fall of 2008 the program has brought close to two hundred young leaders to the United States to conduct independent research and to meet policymakers, business leaders, journalists and academics.

In addition, a yearly CAMCA (Central Asia-Mongolia-Caucasus-Afghanistan) Regional Forum has evolved out of the Rumsfeld Fellowship Program. The 2016 Forum took place in Tbilisi, Georgia and included President Giorgi Margvelashvili, Prime Minister Giorgi Kvirikashvili, Donald H. Rumsfeld, and Ambassador R. James Woolsey among its speakers. The 2017 CAMCA Regional Forum is due to be held in Dushanbe, Tajikistan.

References 

Think tanks based in the United States